Killarmy is an American hip hop group that is affiliated with Wu-Tang Clan  It is one of the earliest and most successful of the many Wu-Tang affiliates along with  Sunz of Man.

Killarmy's music consists of lyrics and songs focused on the themes of military combat, war, terrorism, conspiracy theories, and the teachings of the Five-Percent Nation. The group's instrumentals are usually somber with ominous dark undertones and a raw, gritty production style provided by 4th Disciple.

Career 
Originally consisting of New York rappers 9th Prince (RZA's younger brother), Islord, Dom Pachino, Killa Sin, and Ohio-based producer 4th Disciple; it added Beretta 9 (a.k.a. Kinetic 9) and ShoGun Assasson to its membership in 1996, also from Ohio.

Killarmy released numerous singles from 1995 to 1997, including "Swinging Swords" and "Camouflage Ninjas" and appeared on the Sunz Of Man collaborations "Wake Up" and "Soldiers of Darkness". The group’s debut album, Silent Weapons for Quiet Wars, was released in 1997, just after the release of Wu-Tang Clan's second album and a 12-inch single containing two tracks from the album, which were "Wu-Renegades" and "Clash of the Titans."

In 1997, the group's manager General Wise was shot dead in Steubenville, Ohio, (where several members and Wu-Tang Clan members such as the RZA had spent time in their youth), but the group pressed on undeterred, appearing on the Wu-Tang Killa Bees: The Swarm compilation and each making numerous appearances on other Wu-Tang Clan projects, Wu-Tang affiliates' projects, non-Wu-Tang Clan-related albums such as ONYX – Shut 'Em Down; Vordul Mega – Verbal Relaxation; and movie soundtracks such as Soul in the Hole.

The group's second album, Dirty Weaponry, was released in 1998, and its third album, Fear, Love & War was released on September 11, 2001. In 2010, 9th Prince confirmed that a new album was in the works between the five remaining members (besides Killa Sin) with the first single to be called "The Sound of Gunz" produced by Bronze Nazareth dropping that June. However, production problems and inner dealings have not allowed for the album to be completed. In April 2011, Killarmy released a new single called "One Shot" produced by 4th Disciple. A greatest-hits album was released weeks later by the Wu Music Group label.

In March 2019, Killarmy member, Kinetic 9, was featured in the song "Death 13" on Cryptik Soul's album Killer's Blood.

In January 2020, Kinetic 9 and ShoGun Assason released a seven track EP called “The Truth is Even Darker” with San Francisco-based producer Sticky Ricardo.

In 2020, Killarmy released its long awaited fourth album, "Full Metal Jackets", which was produced by 9th Prince and featured Prodigal Sunn, Killah Priest, and 60-Second Assassin (Sunz Of Man); Timbo King (Royal Fam); Cappadonna (Wu-Tang Clan); La The Darkman; Reverend William Burk; Ill Bill (Non Phixion); William Cooper (Black Market Militia); Stic Man (Dead Prez); Masta Ace; Planet Asia; Ras Kass; Willie the Kid; and El Camino.

Discography

Videography

See also 
List of Wu-Tang Clan affiliates

References 

African-American musical groups
Priority Records artists
Loud Records artists
Five percenters
Hip hop groups from New York City
Musical groups established in 1995
Wu-Tang Clan affiliates